Alan Bates (1934–2003) was a British actor of stage, screen, and television.

Alan Bates may also refer to:
Alan Bates (politician) (1945–2016), doctor and a Democratic politician from the U.S. state of Oregon
Alan Bates (rugby league) (born 1944), British rugby league footballer